Jaro is a district of Iloilo City in the Philippine province of Iloilo on Panay Island in the Western Visayas region. It is the largest in terms of area and population of Iloilo City's seven districts, with 130,700 people in the 2020 census. Once a separate city, Jaro merged with Iloilo City when it was re-incorporated in the 1940s during the American administration in the Philippines. Jaro is the largest of all the seven districts comprising the City of Iloilo. The Iloilo City district of La Paz and the present municipalities of Leganes and Pavia, adjoined as historical parts of Jaro before they became independent.

Jaro lends its name to the Roman Catholic Archdiocese of Jaro, the metropolitan see which encompasses the provinces of Antique, Guimaras, Iloilo, and Negros Occidental.

The Jaro annual Catholic feast of Nuestra Señora de la Candelaria (Our Lady of the Candles), the Roman Catholic patron of the whole Western Visayas and Romblon, held every February 2, is one of the well known Marian festivals in the Philippines. The statue or image of Candelaria (Our Lady of the Candles) perched atop the façade of the Jaro Cathedral, is the first Marian image crowned personally without a papal legate by a pope and saint in the Philippines and in Asia, by Pope John Paul II in 1981.

The town of Jaro is known for being called the Mestizo Town of Iloilo due to the number of prominent Spanish Filipino and old-rich affluent Ilonggo families that came from the area.

Jaro is an important center of faith in the Western Visayas region. It holds numerous institutions founded by different religious sects – the Seminario de San Vicente Ferrer, Jaro Cathedral (National Shrine of Our Lady of the Candles) and the Archdiocese of Jaro by the Spanish Catholics; and the CPU–Iloilo Mission Hospital (the first American and Protestant hospital in the Philippines), the Jaro Evangelical Church (the first Baptist Church in the Philippines and the first Protestant church outside Manila); Jaro Adventist Center (the first Adventist church outside Manila); and the Convention of Philippine Baptist Churches (the first and oldest Baptist churches organization in the Philippines) by the Protestant Americans.

The Central Philippine University which was founded also by the Protestant Baptist Americans in the district, has been ranked as the first Western Visayan university in the list of Asia and world's best universities by Quacquarelli Symonds, one of the big three renowned international university ranking agencies along with the Times Higher Education and Academic Ranking of World Universities (ARWU) in the world.

The recent 21st century economic boom in Iloilo City which poured in investments especially in the real estate and retail sector benefitted Jaro resulting in the rise of various establishments and townships sprouting in the district's area.

History

Spanish colonial era 
Its original name was Salog or Saro. It was also referred to as "Ilaya" or "mountain/dry land" together with La Paz which was referred to as "Ilawod" or "sea/wet land". It had been one of the richer areas of Iloilo City even during the Spanish colonial period (1521–1898) and probably the richest town of the entire colony. Historical artifacts indicate that it had once conducted trade with China and Siam (Thailand) due to its port along the navigable river that ran through the town. It was also the center of religious and economic power in the Visayas during the Spanish rule.

Cityhood 
Jaro officially became a city in 1891. La Paz, which was a former part of Jaro, became independent. Jaro, along with the neighboring towns of La Paz, Mandurriao, and Molo, was incorporated into the then-municipality of Iloilo by virtue of Act No. 719 of 1903. By Executive Order 
No. 64 of December 24, 1907, the former municipalities of Jaro and Pavia (which was incorporated into Iloilo municipality by virtue of Act No. 1333 of April 19, 1905) were separated from the municipality of Iloilo and constituted as its own municipality of Jaro with effect on February 15, 1908. By Executive Order No. 1 of 1921, Pavia was separated from Jaro and made its own municipality.

American colonial era 

By Executive Order No. 97 of December 6, 1915 of the American government, Leganes was removed from the municipality of Santa Barbara and made a part of Jaro with effect on January 1, 1916. Leganes was separated from the municipality of Jaro and made its own municipality with effect on January 1, 1940, by virtue of Executive Order No. 241 of December 23, 1939.

Districthood 
In the 1930s, the neighboring towns of La Paz and Villa de Arevalo were incorporated into Iloilo City, at a time when all economic activities shifted to the port of Iloilo; and Jaro, on the other hand, followed suit to be absorbed into Iloilo City on January 7, 1941.

The present independent Iloilo municipalities of Leganes and Pavia were also formerly under the jurisdiction of Jaro at some points in their history.

Jaro's location between Dungon Creek and the Tigum River fulfills an ideal design for establishing communities during the Spanish colonial era: a site between two rivers, with a church and plaza in the center, and homes of affluent families in the vicinity. The church is the famous Parish of Our Lady of Candles, also known as the Jaro Metropolitan Cathedral, the headquarters of the Roman Catholic Archdiocese of Jaro and the site of a believed to be miraculous statue of the Virgin Mary, which is a statue that has supposedly been growing in size ever since its discovery. Legends also state that among misty days, the Virgin Mary had disappeared from its original nook near the apex of the cathedral and bathed her child in the stream that used to well-forth from Jaro Plaza or that in Moro incursions, the Virgin had assisted in frightening off the raiders. The Marian image perched atop the facade of the cathedral was canonically crowned by Pope John Paul II during his visit on February 21, 1981 (the first Marian image or statue in the Philippines crowned by a Pope and Saint).

The coming of the Americans in the early 20th century when the Philippines was ceded by Spain to the United States through the 1898 Treaty of Paris brought with them the Protestant religion and Iloilo is one of the first places where they came and started a mission in the Philippines. During the American occupation, the Philippine islands were divided into different Protestant missions and Western Visayas came to the jurisdiction of the Baptists. Baptist missionaries came although other Protestant sects came also especially the Presbyterians and they established numerous institutions. The Presbyterians established the Iloilo Mission Hospital in 1901, the first Protestant and American founded hospital in the country while the Baptists established the Jaro Evangelical Church, the first Baptist church in the islands, and the Central Philippine University in 1905, which was founded by William Valentine through a grant given by the American industrialist, oil magnate and philanthropist John D. Rockefeller as the first university in the City of Jaro and also the first Baptist founded and second American university in Asia.

Jaro's celebration of the feast of Nuestra Señora de la Candelaria (Our Lady of the Candles) every February 2 is well known in the Philippines. The fiesta features pageantry with a fiesta queen from one of the prominent Spanish Filipino families of the place, and a cockfight at the Iloilo Coliseum, where cockfighting aficionados from all over the Philippines converge.

The district is notable for its large amount of nineteenth-century architecture. Straddling the main plaza is the antique Jaro Cathedral and the Palasyo, the Archbishop's residence. Early 20th-century colonial American architecture can be found also in American established institutions and structures especially on the main campus of Central Philippine University; the Jaro Evangelical Church, the first Baptist church in the Philippines; and the Jaro City Hall.

The majority of the mestizo families from Iloilo came from this town as it was a center of trade and the main port in the region during the Spanish period; many Spanish traders married natives and settled on the island.

By Commonwealth Act No. 604 of August 22, 1940, the Iloilo city charter was amended and the municipality of Jaro was declared to be incorporated into Iloilo City "on the date that the President of the Philippines may set by proclamation". To that effect, President Manuel L. Quezon issued Proclamation No. 663 on January 7, 1941, giving January 16 as the date of Jaro's incorporation into Iloilo City.

21st century 
At present, Jaro holds the distinction of being the largest of all the seven districts comprising Iloilo City by land area and population. It still also known for being called as the cradle of Christian faith in Western Visayas or as seat of Roman Catholicism and Protestantism in Western Visayas with pioneer and renowned religious institutions founded in the district.

Recent economic boom in Iloilo ushered unprecedented growth with new malls, condominiums, hospitals, banks, hotels and townships by real estate developers either to be built or already opened in the district. Newly opened malls include the CityMall – Tagbak, Jaro of DoubleDragon Properties, the Robinsons Place Jaro of Robinsons Land, Puregold – Jaro, to name a few. On the other hand, projects that are in the pipeline of some of the known Philippine real estate developers include the Sta. Lucia Land's Green Meadows East township in Tacas, Jaro and the SM Prime's 48 hectare land in Balabago, Jaro for their upcoming mall, the SM Prime Iloilo or SM City Iloilo – Jaro.

Population 

Historically, Jaro holds a high-concentration of Filipino-Mestizos and hosts many ancestral mansions of old Visayan families (of Mestizo descent). Family mansions such as those owned by the Lopez, Montinolla, Sanson, Luzariagga, De la Rama etc. families line the streets of this historic district. The French traveler Gabriel Lafond de Lurcy wrote of the place as such in his travelogues.

At present, Jaro which holds the distinction as being the largest by land area of all the seven district of Iloilo City, also is the most populous. The economic boom in Iloilo City from 2010 to 2020, resulted to an urban sprawl converting the once grass fields in the areas of barangays or barrios of Sambag, Tacas, Balabago and Bitoon (Coastal Road), McArthur (from Tabuc Suba to Buntatala) sprouted with subdivisions, retail centers and stores, malls, car showrooms and other establishments, which doubled the district's number of households and population.

Barangays 
The district of Jaro has a total of 42 barangays.

Religion 

Jaro is the cradle of Christian faith in Iloilo and Western Visayas. It is the seat of Roman Catholicism in the region. Some notable religious institutions were built by either the Spanish and American missionaries. The Jaro Cathedral is the seat of the Archdiocese of Jaro which covers the provinces of Iloilo, Antique, Guimaras and Negros Occidental.

It is one of the oldest and largest archdioceses in the country which dates back its founding in 1500s. The provinces of Palawan, Zamboanga, Romblon, Capiz and Mindoro were some of the former parts of the archdiocese but became independent and subsequently under their new respective archdioceses.

The Jaro Cathedral has also been elevated as a National Shrine by the Catholic Bishops Conference of the Philippines (CPBC), the second national shrine in Visayas (first marian dedicated church/cathedral national shrine in Visayas and Mindanao). The cathedral is known for its widely venerated image of the Nuestra Señora de la Candelaria (Our Lady of the Candles) which was brought by the Spanish Catholics, the official patroness of Western Visayas and Romblon. It is the first marian image crowned personally without a papal legate by a pope and saint in the Philippines and Asia, Pope John Paul II.

Besides the Archdiocese of Jaro and the Jaro Cathedral, the Americans which brought the Protestantism, resulted for the establishment of some of the notable institutions that are found in the district – the headquarters of the Convention of Philippine Baptist Churches, the first and oldest Baptist churches union (founded in 1900); the Jaro Adventist Center, the first organized Seventh-day Adventist church in the Philippines (founded in 1914); the Jaro Evangelical Church, the CPU-Iloilo Mission Hospital, the first American and Protestant hospital in the Philippines (founded in 1901), the first Baptist church in the Philippines or the first Protestant church outside Manila (founded in 1900); and the first Baptist and second American university in Asia, the Central Philippine University (founded in 1905).

There are also congregations that established their presence in the district which gains a number of adherents – the Jehovah's Witnesses, Church of Christ of Latter Day Saints, and the Iglesia ni Cristo, to name a few.

Economy

Since the Spanish colonial era, Jaro is well known for being the turn-table of land transportation to northern, western, central and eastern Panay, thus delivery of goods made way in the town as a transit area. The sugar boom made riches that earmarked the rise of affluent old-rich Jareño families – Lopéz of (ABS-CBN Corporation), Ledesma, Locsín, Javellana, Jalandoni, Hofileña, Javellosa, Jalbuena, Montinola (of Bank of the Philippine Islands), Villanueva, and Lizares, to name a few.

The 21st economic boom of Iloilo City after the Iloilo International Airport was transferred to the town of Sta. Barbara, ushered for big real estate, hospitals, banks and retail developers to launch or open malls and townships in the town.

Townships and mixed-use residential and commercial communities

Some of the developments in Jaro include the Sta. Lucia Land has the 10+ hectare Green Meadows East Township with an upscale mall (first outside Luzon), condominiums, hotel and other facilities; the SM Prime's 48 hectare property in Barangay Balabago, Jaro for the upcoming SM City Jaro complex; the Robinsons Place Jaro (the second Robinsons mall in Iloilo); and the CityMall – Tagbak, Jaro of the DoubleDragon Properties.

 SM City – Jaro Complex (no defined name yet) – 48 hectare complex composed of an SM Supermall, 11-tower SMDC Glade Residences condo project, a Waterfront Hotel, and a Shangri-La Hotel – Iloilo. Located in Barangay Balabago, Jaro, Iloilo City.
 Green Meadows East – 14 hectare township of Sta. Lucia Land, Inc. in Barangay Tacas, Jaro composed of a mall, office towers, and condominiums.
 Green Meadows – Iloilo's first lake based residential township located adjacent to the north of Green Meadows East township.

Shopping malls

 SM Iloilo City – Jaro (no defined name yet) – upcoming mall in the 48 hectare property of SM Prime Holdings in Barangay Balabago, Jaro, Iloilo City.
 Sta. Lucia Mall Iloilo – upcoming mall in Green Meadows East township, a 172 hectare property of Sta. Lucia Land, Inc. in Barangay Tacas, Jaro, Iloilo City.
 CityMall Tagbak, Jaro – a community mall type opened on October 10, 2015, it is the 2nd CityMall in Panay and 1st in Iloilo City and province. It is owned by DoubleDragon Properties Corp.

 Robinsons Place Jaro – opened on September 8, 2016, it is the 2nd Robinsons mall in Iloilo City. A three level with lower ground upscale mall, it has cinema theaters, boutique and retail stores, and Robinsons brand establishments like Robinsons Supermarket, Robinsons Department Store, Robinsons Bank, and Robinsons Appliances.

 Jaro Town Square – a community mall located at MacArthur Highway, Barangay Quintin Salas, Jaro, Iloilo City.

Hypermarkets and supermarkets

Supermarket/hypermarket Philippine giants in Jaro include SM Hypermarket Iloilo, the first SM Hypermarket in Panay island Western Visayas region; SM Savemore Jaro 1 (Plaza Jaro); SM Savemore Market 2 (Quintin Salas); Puregold – Jaro (first branch in Iloilo City) and Robinsons Supermarket – Jaro. Local or homegrown supermarket chains include Iloilo Supermart – Tabuc Suba, Suy Sing – Jaro, Iloilo Society Commercial – Jaro, LEDI Supermart – Jaro and Iloilo Supermart – Tagbak.

 SM Hypermarket – first hypermarket in Panay Island. Formerly Makro Iloilo but was bought and renamed as SM Hypermarket Iloilo.
 SM Savemore Quintin Salas – located as a tenant of Jaro Town Square in Quintin Salas, Jaro.
 SM Savemore Jaro – located near in Plaza Jaro and Jaro Cathedral (National Shrine of Our Lady of Candles).
 LEDI Supermart Jaro – La Estrella de Iloilo's (LEDI) Supermarket chain branch in Jaro.
 Puregold Jaro – first Puregold branch in Iloilo City.
 Iloilo Supermart – Tabuk Suba – first branch in Jaro of the homegrown supermarket giant Iloilo Supermart.
 Iloilo Supermart – Tagbak – located in CityMall – Tagbak, Jaro.
 Suy Sing
 Iloilo Society Commercial – Jaro

Automobile and vehicle stores

Several of the known global car brands have their car or automobile showrooms or stores found in Iloilo City specifically located in the District of Jaro – Subaru, Hino, Toyota, Ford, Mazda, JMC (Jiangling Motors), Geely, Suzuki, Volvo Cars, Hyundai and Morris Garages.

 Ford – Iloilo (Sambag, Jaro, Iloilo City)
 Mazda – Iloilo (Sambag, Jaro, Iloilo City)
 Subaru – Iloilo
 JMC – Iloilo
 Morris-Garages (MG) – Iloilo
 Toyota – Iloilo – largest Toyota car store in Panay island.
 Hyundai – Iloilo
 Hyundai Trucks & Buses – Iloilo
 Volvo Cars – Iloilo
 Geely Cars – Iloilo
 Hino – Iloilo
 Chery – Iloilo
 Foton – Iloilo
 Suzuki – Iloilo

Home improvement stores

 Wilcon Depot – Jaro – first Wilcon Depot branch in Iloilo and Panay Island.
 MegaHome Builders Depot – Jaro – first MegaHome Builders Depot branch in Iloilo.
 CitiHardware – Jaro 
 MoostBrand Home Depot – Jaro
 Triumph Home Depot – Jaro
 CitiHardware – Sambag, Jaro (soon)

In the banking and finance sector, Jaro has a plethora of banks accounted about nearly 30 branches of either universal, rural, microfinance-oriented, and thrift banks having their branches in the district.

The banks in Jaro include Banco de Oro (CityMall Tagbak, Jaro; McArthur and Jaro branches), BDO Network Bank, Legazpi Savings Bank, Security Bank (Jaro branch), EastWest (Quintin Salas), RCBC (Jaro), Metrobank (Jaro and McArthur branches), Producers Bank (Jaro), UCPB (Jaro), China Bank Savings (Jaro), PS Bank (Jaro), Robinsons Bank (Robinsons Place Jaro branch), PEN Bank, OK Kauswagan Bank, Development Bank of the Philippines (Jaro Branch), LandBank of the Philippines (Jaro), Eastwest Rural Bank (Buntatala/Tagbak), Card Bank (Jaro Branch Lite Units 1 and 2), LifeBank RB (Jaro Branch Lite Units 1 and 2), Philippine National Bank (McArthur and Jaro Branches), First Community Bank, Bank of the Philippine Islands (Jaro-E. Lopez and McArthur branches), May Bank (Jaro) and Philippine Business Bank (Jaro branch).

There are also microfinance institutions maintaining their branches in the town which include the LifeBank MFI (a microfinance arm of LifeBank), the 3rd largest microfinance institution in the country (largest homegrown MFI in Panay); the ASA Foundation; Card Bank MRI; and Taytay sa Kauswagan, Inc. (TSKI); among others.

Culture

Spanish culture is heavily imprinted in Jareños way of life – the celebrations of patronal fiestas, language, people, education and cuisine. The Roman Catholic faith brought by the Spaniards left a remarkable and significant religious influence found everywhere in Jaro. Throughout the year, annual patronal barrio fiestas are held within the barangays/barrios in Jaro. In cuisine, several Jareño dishes are either heavily Hispanic derived or influenced. American colonizers also created an impact in Jaro's cultural sphere through the introduction of their culture and the Protestant faith which they brought.

Museums and art galleries

Museums are repositories of Jareños, or Ilonggos as a whole, way of life during pre-colonial, colonial and post colonial and modern periods. A plethora of art galleries and museums showcasing exhibits of fossils and historical artifacts and artworks from both local and international artists are found in Jaro.

The Henry Luce III (Museum and Library) of Central Philippine University is the largest library in Western Visayas with a volume or holdings of 250,000+ books, magazines and bibliotech documents. Its Meyer Asian Collection are artworks and artifacts from all over the various regions of Asia. Other collections of Henry Luce include World War II documents, the Centraliana collection/section and the Filipiniana collection.

The Raul Gonzales Museum was built in honor of the late former Department of Justice Secretary, Raul Gonzales. It has exhibits showcasing the family and Justice Secretary's life as a public servant.

The National Museum of the Philippines–Jaro is the satellite regional office of the National Museum of the Philippines housed in the art-deco designed Municipio de Jaro (Jaro Municipal Hall), the Old City Hall of Jaro. The National Museum will convert the said office to a museum showcasing art and photo exhibits depicting Jaro's rich history throughout the different colonial eras.

Several other museum and arts galleries in Jaro include – Patrocinio Gamboa Museum or Jaro Museum, the Angelicum Art Gallery at Angelicum School Iloilo, the Libreria Candelaria at Jaro Cathedral and the Museo del Palacio Arzobispal (Archbishop's Palace Museum).

Performing and visual arts

In performing and visual arts, cultural and musical shows are largely held by institutions such as universities in Jaro. The Rose Memorial Auditorium at Central Philippine University, is the largest theater in Western Visayas notable for being the host venue for known music concerts from famous personas in Philippine music industry. It has a full seating capacity of 4000 persons, and various local, national and international symposiums and music concerts are held in the said auditorium.

Rose Memorial Auditorium was built in honor of the university's former American President Francis Howard Rose, also one of the Hopevale Martyrs during World War II. Concerts held at Rose include performances of the band MYMP, Sharon Cuneta, Sarah Geronimo, The Platters, The Carpenters, Hale (band), Christian Bautista, among others. Notable speeches and symposiums held at the auditorium include famous personalities – Gina Lopez and Gloria Arroyo. Rose was the first annual venue of the prestigious national Bombo Music Festival when during its early years since it was established. Recently, the Cultural Center of the Philippines has designated the Rose Memorial Auditorium for three-year Memorandum of Understanding, as one of the first batch of nine Cultural Center of the Philippines Regional Art Centers or Kaisa sa Sining Regional Art Centers in 2014, which is the only one in Western Visayas region.

Festivals

As Jaro is the seat of Roman Catholicism in Western Visayas, some of its festivals are religious celebrated. The Fiesta de Nuestra Señora de la Candelaria or Feast of the Our Lady of the Candles, commonly known as Fiesta de Jaro (Jaro Fiesta) held every February 2, is one of the largest and known religious feast in honor of Virgin Mary in the Philippines. It's a celebration in honor of Western Visayas's official Roman Catholic patron, Nuestra Señora de la Candelaria (Our Lady of the Candles). It was brought by the Spaniards where it is also widely venerated in the Canary Islands as Virgin of Candelaria.

The feast is a month long celebration which includes an agro-industrial fair with carnival rides and a pageantry with a Reyna del Fiesta (Fiesta Queen) selected annually among the daughters of affluent and old-rich Jareño families – Locsin, Javellana, Lopéz, Hofileña, Jalandoni, Guadarrama, Villar, Ledesma, Cocjin, Jaranilla, and Javellosa. A cockfighting is also held few days before or on the day of fiesta. On Bisperas, a religious procession is held with the coronation of the image of Our Lady of Candles. On the feast day, a traditional banquet is held in every household around the town's square with various religious masses being celebrated in Jaro Cathedral from dawn to dusk.

Another religious celebration brought by the Spanish colonists, the Semana Santa, is also celebrated either it falls in March or April every year. A week long Catholic celebration commemorating the life of Jesus Christ until his crucifixion and resurrection, religious masses and biblical portrayals and plays are held throughout the said celebration.

During yuletide season every year, the Festival of Lights and Music at Central is a known and flocked by tourists Christmas lights display and music festival held at Central Philippine University. It started in 1998 and is considered as the longest running and largest university based Christmas festival of lights in Western Visayas.

A fireworks display and the traditional switching on of Christmas lights accompanied by orchestra music from the CPU Symphonic Band is held on the opening night with known invited personas like Senators, Congressmen, Mayors and Governors are present as guests. The festival has also food kiosk carnival rides in the half moon drive and field. Several nightly cultural celebrations including battle of the bands within the university's colleges are showcased. A Christmas concert is also held a week or so before the Christmas Day at the CPU Church.

Architecture and historical landmarks

Jaro has notable landmarks that attests to its heritage and affluent bygone eras. The sugar boom during the Spanish and early American colonial periods became a factor for old rich Jareño families to built abodes that became testament for it that still stands to this day. Religion became a guiding force for Spanish Catholic missionaries to construct ecclesiastical buildings, including the Jaro Cathedral Campanario de Jaro, one of the few free-standing bell towers in the Philippine islands, and Jaro Cathedral. The Americans who brought Protestantism established the Central Philippine University which holds structures built during the American colonial era.

A fine example of Spanish influence for and organized town center in Jaro is the Plaza Jaro (Jaro Square) which is bounded in all sides by government institutions, a church, schools and the archbishop's palace; a typical layout town plan and civic center found in all Spanish colonies and even in Spain.

The Campanario de Jaro or Jaro Belfry which was built in 1744 by the Spaniards, is one of the few belfries in the country that stood apart from the church where it belonged. It has served both as a religious structure and as a military watch tower during the Spanish Colonial Period. This three-storey tower, which stands 29 meters high, is currently made mainly of bricks and hewn limestone blocks and follows the Baroque-style architecture. The Campanario has suffered destruction from earthquakes that struck the region. The first among these was on July 17, 1787, wherein it has caused major damage in the structure. It was later rebuilt in 1833 under the supervision of the Augustinian friar Fr. Jesse Alvarez. Another earthquake sometime between 1833 and 1881 however caused damages once again to the belfry, which was later restored by the first Bishop of Jaro Msgr. Mariano Cuartero in 1881. The latest was on January 25, 1948, which only suffered minor damages. This was restored by the Iloilo city government and with the supervision of the National Historical Commission of the Philippines (formerly National Historical Institute) in the 1990s. The Jaro Belfry was declared a National Historical Landmark in 1984.

The Plaza Jaro which is now called the Graciano Lopez Jaena Park, the Plaza Jaro is the center of activity in the district and is surrounded by the Jaro Cathedral, the Campanario de Jaro (Jaro Belfry), several old mansions, the Jaro Evangelical Church, the former Jaro City Hall and the Palacio Arzobispal (Archbishop's Palace).

The notable of the institutions which the Spaniards left in Iloilo is the Jaro Cathedral or Catedral de Jaro. Known as the Church of St. Elizabeth of Hungary or the Jaro Cathedral, the present structure was built in and finished in 1864, the year the district was named a diocese by Pope Pius IX through the order of Mariano Cuartero, the first bishop of Jaro. It was destroyed during the Lady of Caycay earthquake of January 1948 and restored by order of Jose Ma. Cuenco, the first archbishop of Jaro in 1956. The cathedral's style is basically Baroque, with the addition of Gothic elements over many renovations. This has been approved by the CBCP as the National Shrine of Our Lady of Candles, the first Marian dedicated church to have such status outside Luzon.

Considered as one of the iconic art deco structures in the country, Municipio de Jaro or Jaro Municipal Hall was built in the 1930s as the City of Jaro's municipal government center. The Jaro Municipal Hall (Municipio de Jaro) is an Art Deco building designed by the Philippine National Artist for Architecture Juan Arellano and was embellished in the facade by an Italian sculptor Francesco Monti. The municipio was previously used as the station of the Philippine National Police in Jaro district.

The National Museum of the Philippines has also declared the Municipio de Jaro as an important cultural property or a National Cultural Treasure. The declaration further implies the structure having "an exceptional art deco design" 

The present Municipio de Jaro has been restored and turned into as the regional headquarters of the National Museum of the Philippines for Iloilo and Western Visayas.

The arrival of the Americans in the early 1900s brought with them the Protestant brand of faith, and Central Philippine University is one of the several known institutions built by them. It was founded in 1905 through a grant given by the American industrialist, oil magnate and philanthropist John D. Rockefeller by the American Baptist missionary William Valentine. Central Philippine University is the First university in the City of Jaro and the first Baptist founded and second American university in Asia. The university has more than 40 buildings with some that dates back to the early 20th century possessing American colonial architecture.

The university pioneered the work-study program which was later patterned and followed by other institutions; established the oldest student governing body in Asia, the Central Philippine University Republic; and has established the first nursing school in the Philippines, the Union Mission Hospital Training School for Nurses, the present day Central Philippine University College of Nursing. It has the biggest library collection in Western Visayas and it is also the first university in the Western Visayas that has been declared as a National Landmark/Historical Landmark by the National Historical Commission of the Philippines.

Some of the heritage structures found within the radius of the Plaza Jaro include:

The Palacio Arzobispal (Archbishop's Palace). The residence of the Archbishop of Jaro, it is located southwest of the Jaro Cathedral and southeast of the Plaza Jaro.

The establishment of church affiliated schools during the Spanish colonial era resulted to the founding of Seminario de San Vicente Ferrer, the first institution of higher learning in Western Visayas and Negros Island. It is located at the back of Ledesma mansion in Calle Seminario.

Few blocks away from Plaza Jaro is the Mansión de Lopez (Lopez Mansion), also known as Nelly Garden, is regaled as the Queen of all heritage houses and mansions in Iloilo and Panay. One of the known iconic structures of Iloilo, it is one of the colonial mansions found in Jaro built by the Lopez family of Iloilo that founded the broadcasting giant ABS-CBN Corporation.

The Casa Montinola y Sanson of the Montinolas of Bank of the Philippine Islands located also along the stretch of the E. Lopez Street (the Philippines' first millionaires lane), is a reminiscent of the Gaston house in Silay City, Negros Occidental.

Another notable mansion, the Lizares Mansion, know houses the Angelicum School Iloilo. Built in beaux-arts design, it was once the mansion of the Lizares family but is now turned with all of all of property the mansion stands, into a school by the Dominicans or Order of Preachers. The University of Santo Tomas rolled out a plan to convert it into its Iloilo campus, a move to integrate all UST-Dominican Order run institutions in the Philippines.

Another notable legacy institution built by the Americans is the CPU–Iloilo Mission Hospital. Founded in 1901 as the Sabine Haines Memorial Union Mission Hospital by the Protestant Presbyterian Americans, it is the first and oldest Protestant founded and American hospital in the Philippines. It has established the first Nursing school in the Philippines in 1906, the Union Mission Hospital Training School for Nurses which is the present Central Philippine University College of Nursing.

Education

Jaro is home to some of Iloilo's known universities and academic institutions. Notable ones are private founded by the Spanish Catholic and American Protestant missionaries.

Higher education institutions in Jaro include:

Central Philippine University (founded 1905) – the first Baptist and second American university in the Philippines and Asia founded through a grant given by the American titan oil magnate, John D. Rockefeller.
Seminario de San Vicente Ferrer (founded 1865) – the oldest institution of higher education in Western Visayas.
Colegio de San Jose (founded 1872) – The first school for girls in Western Visayas.

 St. Roberts International Academy – a quasi basic and higher educational institution.
Pius XII Catechetical Institute – The first catechetical school in the Philippines (defunct).
 FAST Academy – an aviation school.
 Asian College of Aeronautics (ACA) – an aviation school.

The University of Iloilo – Ungka Campus has been bought a property developer and turned it into a small township with a mall – GT Town Center Iloilo. The De Paul College on the other hand, became defunct and its entire property was bought by the Robinsons Land and turned it into a mall, the Robinsons Place Jaro. A part of De Paul's remaining school building and property has been bought and now occupies the St. Robert's International Academy campus.

Also found in the district is the St. Joseph Regional Seminary, in Cubay. It is a theology seminary, as St. Vincent Seminary is a juniorate and philosophy seminary.

The Department of Education (Philippines) supervises public and private basic education in Jaro under the Iloilo City Schools Division.

Private basic educational institutions include:

University of San Agustin – Sambag Campus (Founded 1904) – Basic Education Department Campus of the University of San Agustin.
 Central Philippine University Kindergarten, Central Philippine University Elementary School, Junior High School and Central Philippine University Senior High School.
Angelicum School Iloilo (founded 1978) – Plans of Dominican Province of the Philippines in merging Dominican founded schools will make Angelicum School a University of Santo Tomas – Iloilo campus offering tertiary courses.
Great International School.
Mary and Joseph Academy.
Hua Siong College of Iloilo – Ledesco Campus – first Chinese school outside of Manila.

Public basic educational institutions include the Philippine Science High School Western Visayas Campus (founded 1992), Jaro National High School, RJ Hechanova National High School, Luis Mirasol Memorial School, Jaro I Elementary School, Jaro II Elementary School, Balantang Elementary School, Bitoon Elementary School, and Tacas Elementary School, among others.

Healthcare

The town of Jaro has adequate healthcare institutions equipped with medical facilities catering to the community in general. The Iloilo City Health Office has satellites district and barangay/barrio clinics clustered in the whole town, administering a plethora of immunization and medical programs for Jaro's citizens.

Most of the healthcare institutions in Jaro are church owned/affiliated or privately run corporations. The private hospitals in Jaro include CPU–Iloilo Mission Hospital, ACE Medica Center – Iloilo, Metro Iloilo Hospital and Medical Center, and CPU Birthing Center.

CPU–Iloilo Mission Hospital which was founded in 1901 by Protestant Americans as the Sabine Haines Memorial Union Mission Hospital (Union Mission Hospital), is the oldest running hospital in Western Visayas, also the first American and Protestant hospital in the country. It established the first nursing school in the country in 1906, the Union Mission Hospital Training School for Nurses, the present day Central Philippine University College of Nursing. It is also the first hospital for soldiers and constabulary in the Philippines during the American colonial period. A ~500 bed Level III tertiary hospital, CPU–Iloilo Mission Hospital's facilities include the 2 storey Main Hall, the 4 storey IMH Medical Arts Building, the 2 storey CPU–IMH Medical Education Training Center, the 4 storey IMH Centennial Building, and the soon to open 7 storey IMH Medical Center tower.

ACE Medical Center – Iloilo of Allied Care Experts and Metro Iloilo Hospital and Medical Center are newly built private hospitals in Jaro.

The WVSU Medical Center is the sole government run hospital in Jaro, and is administered and operated by West Visayas State University but is independent. The Department of Health of the Philippines established and built the already finished auxiliary healthcare unit of the hospital – the WVSU Cancer Center for Western Visayas. The 10 storey WVSU Lung, Kidney and Heart Center for Western Visayas is also in the pipeline to be built in the hospital by the said government agency.

Transportation

Integrated transport terminals

Jaro has been a turn-table of civil land transportation in Panay island. The largest enter-city provincial transport terminals in Iloilo City are in Jaro. The Iloilo City Tagbak-Jaro Provincial Perimeter Boundary Terminal (Tagbak Terminal) which serves the routes to and from northern Iloilo and provinces of Capiz and Aklan is the largest. The terminal caters primarily to buses and vans plying various routes in said provinces and area of the province. Few kilometers away is the Jaro-Iloilo Ceres Terminal in Camalig, Jaro, the largest terminal of the bus giant company, Vallacar Transit (Ceres), in Panay.

The Central Iloilo Provincial Perimeter Boundary Terminal (Christ the King/Ungka-Jaro Terminal), serves routes for Central Iloilo – municipalities of Leon, Santa Barbara, New Lucena, Cabatuan, Janiuay, Lambunao, Maasin, Iloilo, Calinog, and province of Capiz municipalities of Tapaz and Jamindan.

Public transportation

The primary mode of public transportation in Jaro are PUJs or Public Utility Jeepneys. The largest and famous jeepney routes in Iloilo City are the Jaro CPU and Jaro CPU Ungka UI which serves the Ungka/Pavia Terminal to Parola (City Proper) via Central Philippine University.

The city's government in concordat with the jeepney modernization plan in phasing out old jeepneys in the country of the Philippine government, has adopted the program by initially rolling-out a number of modern public jeepneys plying the Jaro CPU Iloilo City and Jaro CPU Ungka UI (Robinsons Place Pavia) routes.

There are also taxis in the district served by private operators.

Bicycling

Iloilo City is dubbed as the Bike Capital of the Philippines. A network of protected bike lanes of the long stretch of Diversion Road which traverses in the Jaro areas of Barangay Dungon A, back of Central Philippine University, Dungon B, Sambag and Ungka (Jaro), is one of the longest roads with bicycle lane in the country. It stretches up to the district of Mandurriao in the Iloilo Esplanade 1 and 3.

The Iloilo City bicycle lane network is further expanded in some areas in Jaro including the district's part of Circumferential Road (C1) and Plaza Jaro to Casa Real de Iloilo (Provincial Capitol).

Airport and seaport

Jaro which is part of Iloilo City is also served by a seaport and airport. The Port of Iloilo serves domestic shipping and cargo routes to/from Manila, Cebu, Puerto Princesa, Bacolod, Cagayan de Oro, Zamboanga City, Davao and General Santos. The Iloilo International Cargo Port in Loboc, Lapuz district, is a port of call for foreign cargo vessels. The Iloilo International Airport in the northern town of Santa Barbara, Iloilo, is the primary airport serving Metro Iloilo and Guimaras. It serves domestic air routes to Manila, Clark, Cebu, Cuyo Island, Puerto Princesa, Sipalay, Cagayan de Oro, General Santos and Davao City. It is also served by international routes to and from Singapore and Hong Kong.

Notable people

Jaro has produced or is associated with people who became prominent and distinguished in their fields of services. Associated Jareños are the town's people who are not citizens by birth or who stayed in Jaro either as professors, staff or studied in its academic institutions; took a residence for a short or long period of time in the district; and other factors. Few of the notable Jareños include:

 Graciano López Jaena - Philippine national hero, orator, writer, and propagandist, who is well known in publishing the La Solidaridad.
Fernando López – former Vice-President of the Philippines and brother of Eugenio Lopez Sr.
Eugenio Lopez Sr. – former Chairman of the Lopez Group of Companies.
Eugenio Lopez, Jr. – former Chairman Emeritus of ABS-CBN.
Eugenio Lopez III – present Chairman of ABS-CBN.
Grace Poe – Filipino Senator.
Raul M. Gonzalez – former Secretary of Justice of the Philippines.
William Valentine – founder of Central Philippine University, the first Baptist and second American university in the Philippines and Asia.
Magdalena Jalandoni – Hiligaynon poet.
Jaime Cardinal Sin – former Archbishop of Jaro and Archbishop of Manila. One of the most iconic persona during EDSA People Power that ousted the former Philippine President Ferdinand Marcos which ended the Martial Law in the Philippines in 1986.
Miriam Defensor-Santiago – Filipino senator and the first Asian to be elected as a member of International Criminal Court.
Franklin Drilon – Senator.
Francis Jardeleza – Associate Justice, Supreme Court of the Philippines; former Solicitor General.
Alexis Belonio – Scientist and inventor. First Filipino laureate or awardee of the prestigious Rolex Award for Enterprise.
Leonor Orosa-Goquingco – National Artist for Dance.
Perfecto Yasay – Foreign Affairs Secretary.
 Patrocinio Gamboa - Filipina revolutionary during the Philippine revolution against the Spanish rule. Involved in the historical first hoisting of Philippine flag outside Luzon in Santa Barbara, Iloilo.
 Manuel Araneta Jr. - Filipino basketball player who competed in the 1948 Summer Olympics; father of Liza Araneta-Marcos, First Lady of the Philippines.

See also 

 Jaro Cathedral
 Roman Catholic Archdiocese of Jaro
 Nuestra Señora de la Candelaria de Jaro
 López family of Iloilo

References

External links 

 Iloilo City Government Official Website
 Iloilo Information Guide 
 Lopez Museum

Districts of Iloilo City
Former cities in the Philippines